The Bolesławiec rail viaduct is a railway bridge over the river Bóbr in Bolesławiec in Lower Silesia, Poland.

Entirely made of stone, it is one of the longest bridges of its type in Poland and in Europe.

Statistics 
 Length: 490 m
 Height: 26 m
 Width: 8 m
 Number of spans: 35
 Main spans: 15 m, 11.5 m and 5.65 m
 Construction material: sandstone
 Construction period: 2 years
 Construction completion: 1846

History 
Rail transport came to Bolesławiec (then known as Bunzlau and part of Prussian Silesia) in 1845. Work was already being carried out on the extension of a rail line towards Węgliniec. Part of this work was a crossing of the river Bóbr. The Prussian architect Frederick Engelhardt Gansel was chosen for the project. Work began on June 18, 1844. Building work directly employed more than 600 people with another 3200 indirectly related to its construction. The construction took two years and was completed in July 1846.

Near the end of the war in 1945, retreating Germans blew up the central span crossing. After the war, reconstruction was fast and the bridge was returned to service in 1947.

In 2006, the viaduct was illuminated at the cost of nearly 180 thousand złoty. It is illuminated with 58 compact projectors which are mounted on the inner sides of the pillars of the bridge.

In October 2009, renovation work on the viaduct was completed. It had been sandblasted, its design completely renovated and maintained. In addition, the viaduct gained a new traction network, track layout, and rail extensions from both sides. Due to these upgrades, trains were able to travel up to 160 km/h.

Key dates 
 17.05.1844 - the foundation stone was laid for the construction of the viaduct
 18.06.1844 - start of construction
 05.07.1846 - completion of construction
 01.09.1846 - scheduled to start moving trains
 17.09.1846 - the official grand opening of the viaduct made by King Frederick William IV
 10.02.1945 - the retreating German army blew up one of the spans of the viaduct and three of its vaults
 10.10.2009 - the official dedication of the viaduct after renovation with a light and sound show

External links 
 PKP Bolesławiec - Information (in Polish) about the bridge including photos and videos
 A photo gallery showing the light and sound show from 2009

Bridges in Poland
Railway bridges in Poland
Bridges completed in 1846